Cisneros is a village in Buenaventura Municipality, Valle del Cauca Department in Colombia. It is located at the border between Buenaventura and Dagua municipalities.

Climate
Cisneros has a tropical rainforest climate (Af) with heavy rainfall year-round.

References

Populated places in the Valle del Cauca Department